Atriplex hortensis, known as garden orache, red orache or simply orache (also spelled orach), mountain spinach, French spinach, or arrach, is a species of plant in the amaranth family used as a leaf vegetable that was common before spinach and still grown as a warm-weather alternative to that crop. For many years, it was classified in the goosefoot family, but it has now been absorbed into the Amaranthaceae. It is Eurasian, native to Asia and Europe, and widely naturalized in Canada, the United States, Australia, and New Zealand.

Description 
Atriplex hortensis is a hardy annual plant, with an erect, branching stem. It varies in height from two to six feet, according to the variety and soil. The leaves are variously shaped, but somewhat oblong, comparatively thin, and slightly acidic to the taste. The flowers are small and obscure, greenish or reddish, corresponding to a degree with the color of the foliage of the plant. The seeds are small, black, surrounded by a thin, pale-yellow membrane, and they retain their viability for three years. There are varieties with red, white and green leaves.

Use and cultivation 
Atriplex hortensis has a salty, spinach-like taste. The leaves are used cooked or raw in salads. The green leaves were once used to color pasta in Italy. A common use of the plant is to balance out the acidic flavor of sorrel.

It was commonly grown in Mediterranean regions from early times, until spinach became the more favored leaf vegetable. It is commonly grown as a warm-weather alternative to spinach because it is more tolerant of heat and slower to bolt in warm weather.

Gallery

References 

hortensis
Flora of Asia
Leaf vegetables
Flora of Europe
Plants described in 1753
Taxa named by Carl Linnaeus